The Shaar Shalom Synagogue (inscribed עדת שער שלום, Adas Shaar Shalom on the corner of the building) in Halifax, Nova Scotia, is a Conservative Jewish synagogue. The Shaar Shalom Synagogue was among the first Canadian Conservative synagogues to hire women in clergy positions and welcome same-sex partners as members.

History
It was founded in 1953 by a collective of families who were members of Halifax's Baron de Hirsch Synagogue who sought a community that would permit "family seating" (also known as mixed seating or the opportunity for men and women to sit together). They sought an egalitarian ideology that would permit women's political and ritual leadership. 

The community has had professional leaders over the years, including Dr. Irving Perlin. Perlin was an obstetrician who served as a lay hazzan and mohel, and presided over weekly sabbath liturgies and ceremonial circumcisions. The synagogue hosted groups such as a Catholic Women's League chapter and was a supporter of Camp Kadimah.

Many of the art pieces still decorating the synagogue were procured during David Jacobs' tenure from 1953-1957. The building that stands at the corner of Oxford St. and Pepperell St. was dedicated on October 31, 1955.

Rabbinic Leaders

 1953-1957: Rabbi David J. Jacobs, an enthusiast of modern Jewish art
 1957-1961: Unknown
 1962-1964: Rabbi Emanuel S. Goldsmith
 1965-1968: Unknown

 1969: Rabbi Dr. Max Wallach.
 1970-1974: Unknown
 1975-1976: Rabbi Leo Heim
 1977: Unknown
 1983-1995: Rabbi Jacob Chinitz
 1995-1998: Rabbi Pamela Hoffman (part-time, and later full-time)
 1999-2000: Unknown
 2000-2001: Rabbi Dr. Michael Goldberg, author of Why Should Jews Survive?: Looking Past the Holocaust Toward a Jewish Future (Oxford University Press, 1995)
 2001-2010: Ari Isenberg-Grzeda (part-time, rabbinical students)
 2010-2011: Catherine Clark & Joshua Rabin (part-time, rabbinical students)
 2011-2013: Ari Isenberg-Grzeda (part-time, rabbinical student)
 2013-2015: Rabbi Ari Isenberg-Grzeda (full-time)
 2015-2016: Rabbi Irit Printz (part-time)
 2016–2019: Rabbi Dr. Raysh Weiss (full-time Senior Rabbi) & Rabbi Jonah Rank (part-time, rabbinic educator position)
 2019-present: Rabbi Gary Karlin (full-time)

References 

Conservative synagogues in Canada
History of Nova Scotia
Buildings and structures in Halifax, Nova Scotia
Culture of Halifax, Nova Scotia
Jewish organizations established in 1953
Synagogues in Nova Scotia